James Dorsey Robinson (May, 1873 – death unknown) was an American Negro league pitcher between 1898 and 1905.

A native of Frederick, Maryland, Robinson made his professional debut in 1898 with the Cuban X-Giants. He played for the X-Giants again in 1899 and 1904, and finished his career with the Brooklyn Royal Giants in 1905.

References

External links
  and Seamheads

1873 births
Date of birth missing
Place of death missing
Year of death missing
Brooklyn Royal Giants players
Cuban X-Giants players
Baseball pitchers